Edward Tudor (1537–1553) was Edward VI of England and son of Henry VIII and Jane Seymour.

See also
Edward Tudor-Pole (born 1954), singer
Ted Tudor (born 1935), English footballer